The year 1963 in film involved some significant events, including the big-budget epic Cleopatra and two films with all-star casts, How the West Was Won and It's a Mad, Mad, Mad, Mad World.

Top-grossing films (U.S.)

The top ten 1963 released films by box office gross in North America are as follows:

Events
 January 9 – Joseph Vogel resigns as president of MGM and is replaced by Robert O'Brien.
 February 20 – The classic epic western How the West Was Won premieres in the United States. It is an instant success with both audiences and critics and becomes the biggest moneymaker for MGM since Ben-Hur.
 June 12 – Cleopatra, starring Elizabeth Taylor, Rex Harrison and Richard Burton, premieres at the Rivoli Theatre in New York City. Its staggering production costs nearly bankrupted Twentieth Century Fox and the adulterous affair between Taylor and Burton made the publicity even worse. Cleopatra marked the only instance that a film would be the highest-grossing film of a year while still losing money, thus establishing it as, at the time, the biggest box office disaster in cinema history. The film's terrible reception harmed the reputation of director Joseph L. Mankiewicz, who had an esteemed career for directing classics like A Letter to Three Wives, All About Eve, Julius Caesar, The Barefoot Contessa, Guys and Dolls, and Suddenly Last Summer. It effectively destroyed the career of its well-known producer Walter Wanger, who never worked in Hollywood or on another film again; he died five years later at the age of 74 of a heart attack. Much of the blame for the film's failures could be pointed at Taylor's super-diva personality, her health issues, her and Burton's adulterous affair, and the studio's inadequate management. It wouldn't be until two years later that Rodgers and Hammerstein's adaptation of The Sound of Music would help rescue Fox from bankruptcy by becoming one of the highest-grossing motion pictures of all time.
 November 7 – The comedy It's a Mad, Mad, Mad, Mad World premieres, with one of the finest all-star ensemble casts ever. It is also the first comedy film ever directed by Stanley Kramer, best known for directing serious human drama films on controversial subjects like The Defiant Ones, Inherit the Wind, Judgment at Nuremberg, and Guess Who's Coming to Dinner.
 December 25 – Walt Disney's production of The Sword in the Stone premieres. It is the second adaptation of T. H. White's The Once and Future King after the Alan Jay Lerner and Frederick Loewe musical Camelot, the first cinematic adaptation of the novel, and the 13th film adaptation of the legend of King Arthur.

Awards 

Academy Awards:

Best Picture: Tom Jones — Woodfall, United Artists-Lopert (British)
Best Director: Tony Richardson – Tom Jones
Best Actor: Sidney Poitier – Lilies of the Field
Best Actress: Patricia Neal – Hud
Best Supporting Actor: Melvyn Douglas – Hud
Best Supporting Actress: Margaret Rutherford – The V.I.P.s
Best Foreign Language Film: 8½ (Otto e mezzo), directed by Federico Fellini, Italy

Golden Globe Awards:

Drama:
Best Picture: The Cardinal
Best Actor: Sidney Poitier - Lilies of the Field
Best Actress: Leslie Caron - The L-Shaped Room
 
Comedy or Musical:
Best Picture: Tom Jones
Best Actor: Alberto Sordi - To Bed or Not to Bed
Best Actress: Shirley MacLaine - Irma la Douce

Other
Best Supporting Actor: John Huston - The Cardinal
Best Supporting Actress: Margaret Rutherford – The V.I.P.s
Best Director: Elia Kazan - America America

Palme d'Or (Cannes Film Festival):
The Leopard (Il Gattopardo), directed by Luchino Visconti, Italy

Golden Lion (Venice Film Festival):
Hands Over the City (Le mani sulla città), directed by Francesco Rosi, Italy

Golden Bear (Berlin Film Festival):
Il diavolo (To Bed... or Not to Bed), directed by Gian Luigi Polidoro, Italy

1963 film releases
United States unless stated

January–March
January 1963
16 January
The Hook
Son of Flubber
22 January
The Young Racers
25 January
The Raven
30 January
Diamond Head
February 1963
13 February
8½ (Italy)
A Child Is Waiting
14 February
The Day Mars Invaded Earth
27 February
Follow the Boys
March 1963
1 March
High and Low (Japan)
3 March
California
The Long Ships
4 March
In the Cool of the Day
6 March
Diary of a Madman
Papa's Delicate Condition
7 March
I Could Go On Singing
15 March
House of the Damned
21 March
The Balcony
26 March
Operation Bikini
27 March
Come Fly with Me
The Courtship of Eddie's Father
28 March
The Birds
Love Is a Ball
29 March
Miracle of the White Stallions

April–June
April 1963
3 April
It Happened at the World's Fair
My Six Loves
Nine Hours to Rama
The Ugly American
4 April
Bye Bye Birdie
Call Me Bwana
8 April
The Sadist
13 April
Critic's Choice
17 April
The Man from the Diners' Club
21 April
Youth of the Beast (Japan)
24 April
Free, White and 21
29 April
Flaming Creatures
May 1963
May 12
Lord of the Flies (United Kingdom)
15 May
Black Zoo
Drums of Africa
16 May
Spencer's Mountain
20 May
Maniac
22 May
Dime with a Halo
29 May
55 Days at Peking
Hud
The List of Adrian Messenger
Tammy and the Doctor
June 1963
2 June
Savage Sam
4 June
The Nutty Professor
5 June
Come Blow Your Horn
Irma la Douce
Lancelot and Guinevere
12 June
Cleopatra
Donovan's Reef
The Girl Hunters
Island of Love
15 June
The Yellow Canary
17 June
The Terror
19 June
Captain Sindbad
Jason and the Argonauts
PT 109 released five months before John F. Kennedy was assassinated in Dallas, Texas.
The Stripper
21 June
A Gathering of Eagles

July–September
July 1963
4 July
The Great Escape
6 July
Blood Feast
7 July
Summer Magic
17 July
Tarzan's Three Challenges
The Thrill of It All
31 July
Cattle King
Gidget Goes to Rome
Toys in the Attic
August 1963
7 August
Beach Party
For Love or Money
10 August
The Young and The Brave
11 August
Matango (Japan)
14 August
Flipper
15 August
Billy Liar (United Kingdom)
Promises! Promises!
17 August
Black Sabbath
18 August
A Ticklish Affair
21 August
Cairo
The Caretakers
The Three Stooges Go Around the World in a Daze
28 August
The Gun Hawk
The Haunted Palace
September 1963
2 September
The Cool World
4 September
The Crawling Hand
Wall of Noise
6 September
Goldilocks and the Three Bares
11 September
Of Love and Desire
Shock Corridor
Twice-Told Tales
13 September
The V.I.P.s
18 September
The Haunting
In the French Style
X: The Man with the X-ray Eyes
The Young Swingers
25 September
Dementia 13
Thunder Island
29 September
Tom Jones

October–December
October 1963
1 October
Lilies of the Field
10 October
From Russia with Love (United Kingdom/United States)
16 October
Twilight of Honor
17 October
All the Way Home
19 October
Johnny Cool
23 October
Under the Yum Yum Tree
24 October
Mary, Mary
26 October
The Lost World of Sinbad (Japan)
29 October
Cry of Battle
30 October
A New Kind of Love
The Old Dark House
31 October
The World Ten Times Over (United Kingdom)
November 1963
5 November
Palm Springs Weekend
6 November
Gunfight at Comanche Creek
7 November
Carry On Cabby (United Kingdom)
It's a Mad, Mad, Mad, Mad World
13 November
The Skydivers
Sunday in New York
Take Her, She's Mine
14 November
The Wheeler Dealers
18 November
The Victors
20 November
The Incredible Journey
23 November
McLintock!
27 November
Fun in Acapulco
Soldier in the Rain
28 November
Who's Minding the Store?
December 1963
5 December
Charade
13 December
The Cardinal
15 December
America America
18 December
The Ceremony
Kings of the Sun
The Pink Panther 
Samson and the Slave Queen
22 December
Atragon (Japan)
23 December
Captain Newman, M.D.
Ladybug Ladybug
One Man's Way
25 December
4 for Texas
The Comedy of Terrors
Love with the Proper Stranger
Move Over, Darling
The Prize
The Sword in the Stone
Who's Been Sleeping in My Bed?
26 December
Act One

Notable films released in 1963
United States except where noted..

#
13 Assassins (十三人の刺客, Jūsan-nin no shikaku), directed by Eiichi Kudo – (Japan)
13 Frightened Girls, directed and produced by William Castle
4 for Texas, starring Frank Sinatra, Dean Martin, Ursula Andress, Anita Ekberg
8½, directed by Federico Fellini, starring Marcello Mastroianni, Claudia Cardinale, Anouk Aimée -- Oscar for Best Foreign Language Film – (Italy)
55 Days at Peking, starring Charlton Heston, Ava Gardner, David Niven

A
Les abysses, directed by Nikos Papatakis – (France)
Act One, directed by Dore Schary and starring George Hamilton
An Actor's Revenge (Yukinojō Henge), directed by Kon Ichikawa – (Japan)
Al Nasser Salah Ad-Din (Saladin), directed by Youssef Chahine – (Egypt)
All the Way Home, starring Jean Simmons, Robert Preston, Ronnie Claire Edwards
Alone on the Pacific (Taiheiyo hitori-botchi), directed by Kon Ichikawa – (Japan)
America, America (a.k.a. The Anatolian Smile) by Elia Kazan
Any Number Can Win (Mélodie en sous-sol), starring Jean Gabin and Alain Delon – (France/Italy)
Apache Gold (Winnetou – 1. Teil), directed by Harald Reinl – (West Germany/Italy/Yugoslavia)
Atragon (Kaitei gunkan), directed by Ishirō Honda – (Japan)
Attack Squadron! (太平洋の翼, Taiheiyō no Tsubasa), directed by Shue Matsubayashi – (Japan)

B
The Bakery Girl of Monceau (La boulangère de Monceau), directed by Éric Rohmer, starring Barbet Schroeder – (France)
The Balcony, starring Shelley Winters, Peter Falk and Leonard Nimoy
Banana Peel (Peau de banane),  starring Jeanne Moreau and Jean Paul Belmondo – (France/Italy/West Germany)
Bandini (Imprisoned), directed by Bimal Roy, starring Ashok Kumar – (India)
Barren Lives (Vidas Secas), directed by Nelson Pereira dos Santos – (Brazil)
The Bastard (悪太郎, Akutarō), directed by Seijun Suzuki – (Japan)
Bay of Angels (La Baie des Anges), directed by Jacques Demy, starring Jeanne Moreau – (France)
Beach Party, directed by William Asher, starring Frankie Avalon, Annette Funicello, Bob Cummings, Dorothy Malone
Bébo's Girl (La ragazza di Bube), starring Claudia Cardinale and George Chakiris – (Italy)
The Big City (Mahanagar), directed by Satyajit Ray – (India)
Billy Liar, directed by John Schlesinger, starring Tom Courtenay and Julie Christie – (U.K.)
The Birds, directed by Alfred Hitchcock, starring Tippi Hedren, Rod Taylor, Suzanne Pleshette, Jessica Tandy
Bitter Harvest, starring Janet Munro – (U.K.)
The Black Abbot (Der Schwarze Abt), directed by Franz Josef Gottlieb – (West Germany)
Black Sabbath (I tre volti della paura), starring Boris Karloff – (Italy/U.K./France)
Blood Feast, directed by Herschell Gordon Lewis
Bluebeard (Landru), directed by Claude Chabrol – (France/Italy)
Il Boom, directed by Vittorio De Sica, starring Alberto Sordi – (Italy)
Bushido, Samurai Saga, directed by Tadashi Imai (Bushidô zankoku monogatari) – (Japan)
Bye Bye Birdie, starring Janet Leigh, Dick Van Dyke, Ann-Margret

C
Call Me Bwana, directed by Gordon Douglas, starring Bob Hope, Anita Ekberg, Edie Adams
Captain Newman, M.D., directed by David Miller, starring Gregory Peck, Tony Curtis, Bobby Darin, Eddie Albert, Angie Dickinson
Captain Sindbad
The Carabineers (Les Carabiniers), directed by Jean-Luc Godard – (France)
Carbide and Sorrel (Karbid und Sauerampfer) – (East Germany)
The Cardinal, directed by Otto Preminger, starring Tom Tryon, Carol Lynley, Romy Schneider, John Huston
The Caretaker, starring Alan Bates and Robert Shaw – (U.K.)
The Caretakers, starring Joan Crawford, Robert Stack, Polly Bergen
Carom Shots (Carambolages), directed by Marcel Bluwal – (France)
Carry On Cabby, starring Sid James and Hattie Jacques – (U.K.)
Carry On Jack, starring Kenneth Williams and Bernard Cribbins – (U.K.)
The Cassandra Cat (Až přijde kocour) – (Czechoslovakia)
The Ceremony, directed by Laurence Harvey 
Chair de poule (a.k.a. Highway Pickup), directed by Julien Duvivier – (France)
Charade, directed by Stanley Donen, starring Cary Grant, Audrey Hepburn, Walter Matthau, George Kennedy, James Coburn
A Child Is Waiting, starring Judy Garland and Burt Lancaster
Cleopatra, starring Elizabeth Taylor, Rex Harrison, Richard Burton – (U.S./U.K./Switzerland)
Codine, directed by Henri Colpi – (France/Romania)
Come Blow Your Horn, starring Frank Sinatra, Tony Bill, Barbara Rush, Jill St. John
Come Fly With Me, starring Pamela Tiffin, Lois Nettleton, Dolores Hart
The Conjugal Bed (L'ape regina), starring Ugo Tognazzi – (Italy)
Contempt (Le mépris), directed by Jean-Luc Godard, starring Brigitte Bardot, Jack Palance, Michel Piccoli – (France)
The Cool World, directed by Shirley Clarke
The Corrupt (Symphonie pour un massacre), directed by Jacques Deray
The Courtship of Eddie's Father, directed by Vincente Minnelli, starring Glenn Ford, Shirley Jones, Stella Stevens, Dina Merrill, Ron Howard
Crisis: Behind a Presidential Commitment, documentary film directed by Robert Drew
Critic's Choice, starring Bob Hope and Lucille Ball
Crooks in Clover (Les tontons flingueurs), starring Lino Ventura – (France/Italy/West Germany)
The Cry (Křik) – (Czechoslovakia)

D
The Damned, directed by Joseph Losey, starring Macdonald Carey – (U.K.)
The Day and the Hour (Le jour et l'heure), directed by René Clément, starring Simone Signoret and Stuart Whitman – (France)
Dementia 13, directed by Francis Ford Coppola
The Devil (Il diavolo), starring Alberto Sordi, Golden Bear winner – (Italy)
Diamond Head, starring Charlton Heston, Yvette Mimieux, France Nuyen, George Chakiris, James Darren
Diary of a Madman, starring Vincent Price, Nancy Kovack, Elaine Devry
Dil Ek Mandir (The Heart Is a Temple) – (India)
Donovan's Reef, directed by John Ford, starring John Wayne and Lee Marvin
Drama of the Lark (Pacsirta) – (Hungary)

E
El Dorado, directed by Menahem Golan, starring Topol – (Israel)
Empress Wu Tse-Tien – (Hong Kong)
The Empty Canvas (La noia), starring Bette Davis and Horst Buchholz – (Italy)
The Engagement (I fidanzati), directed by Ermanno Olmi – (Italy)
The Executioner (El Verdugo), directed by Luis García Berlanga, starring Nino Manfredi – (Spain)

F
Father Came Too!, starring James Robertson Justice and Leslie Phillips – (U.K.)
The Fiancés (I fidanzati), directed by Ermanno Olmi – (Italy)
The Fire Within (Le feu follet), directed by Louis Malle – (France)
Flaming Creatures, directed by Jack Smith
Flipper, starring Chuck Connors and Luke Halpin
Follow the Boys, starring Connie Francis, Paula Prentiss, Dany Robin, Janis Paige
For Love or Money, starring Kirk Douglas and Mitzi Gaynor
From Russia with Love, the second James Bond film, starring Sean Connery, Daniela Bianchi, Pedro Armendáriz, Robert Shaw, Lotte Lenya – (U.K./U.S.)
Fun in Acapulco, starring Elvis Presley and Ursula Andress

G
A Gathering of Eagles, starring Rock Hudson
Gidget Goes to Rome, starring Cindy Carol
The Girl Hunters, starring Mickey Spillane (as Mike Hammer), with Lloyd Nolan, Shirley Eaton
The Girl Who Knew Too Much (La ragazza che sapeva troppo), directed by Mario Bava – (Italy)
Le glaive et la balance (a.k.a. Two are Guilty), starring Anthony Perkins – (France/Italy)
Gone Are the Days!, starring Ossie Davis, Ruby Dee and Godfrey Cambridge
Goryeojang (고려장), written, produced and directed by Kim Ki-young – (South Korea)
The Great Escape, directed by John Sturges, starring Steve McQueen, James Garner, Charles Bronson, Richard Attenborough, David McCallum, Donald Pleasence
The Green Years (Os Verdes Anos) – (Portugal)

H
Hallelujah the Hills, directed by Adolfas Mekas
Hands over the City (Le mani sulla città), directed by Francesco Rosi, starring Rod Steiger – (Italy)
The Haunted Palace, directed by Roger Corman, starring Vincent Price
The Haunting, directed by Robert Wise, starring Julie Harris – (U.K.)
Heaven Sent (Un drôle de paroissien), starring Bourvil – (France)
Heavens Above!, directed by the Boulting brothers, starring Peter Sellers – (U.K.)
High and Low (天国と地獄), directed by Akira Kurosawa, starring Toshiro Mifune – (Japan)
The Hook, starring Kirk Douglas
The Hours of Love (Le ore dell'amore), directed by Luciano Salce – (Italy)
The Householder (Gharbar), directed by James Ivory, starring Shashi Kapoor and Leela Naidu – (India)
How to Be Loved (Jak być kochaną), starring Zbigniew Cybulski – (Poland)
Hud, directed by Martin Ritt, starring Paul Newman, Patricia Neal, Brandon deWilde, Melvyn Douglas

I
I Could Go On Singing, starring Judy Garland and Dirk Bogarde – (U.K./U.S.)
Ikarie XB-1 (Icarus XB-1) – (Czechoslovakia)
L'immortelle (The Immortal) – (France/Turkey)
In the Cool of the Day, starring Peter Finch, Jane Fonda, Angela Lansbury
The Indian Scarf (Das indische Tuch), directed by Alfred Vohrer – (West Germany)
The Incredible Journey
The Insect Woman (Nippon konchūki), directed by Shohei Imamura - (Japan)
Irma la Douce, directed by Billy Wilder, starring Jack Lemmon and Shirley MacLaine
The Iron Maiden (a.k.a. Swinging Maiden), directed by Gerald Thomas and starring Michael Craig – (U.K.)
Island of Love, starring Robert Preston and Walter Matthau
It Happened at the World's Fair, starring Elvis Presley
It's a Mad, Mad, Mad, Mad World, directed by Stanley Kramer, starring Spencer Tracy, Milton Berle, Phil Silvers, Sid Caesar, Jonathan Winters, Mickey Rooney, Buddy Hackett, Ethel Merman, Dorothy Provine, Edie Adams, Dick Shawn and many more
It's All Happening (a.k.a. The Dream Maker), directed by Don Sharp – (U.K.)
Ivan's Childhood (originally Ivanovo detstvo), directed by Andrei Tarkovsky, starring Nikolay Burlyaev, Valentin Zubkov, and Evgeniy Zharikov – (U.S.S.R.)

J
Jason and the Argonauts, starring Todd Armstrong – (U.K./U.S.)
Johnny Cool, starring Henry Silva and Elizabeth Montgomery
Judex, directed by Georges Franju – (France)

K
Kanto Wanderer (Kantō mushuku) – (Japan)
Kings of the Sun, directed by J. Lee Thompson, starring Yul Brynner and George Chakiris
Kiss of the Vampire, directed by Don Sharp

L
Ladies Who Do, starring Harry H. Corbett, Robert Morley and Peggy Mount – (U.K.)
Ladybug Ladybug, directed by Frank Perry
The Leopard (Il Gattopardo), directed by Luchino Visconti, starring Burt Lancaster, Claudia Cardinale, Alain Delon – Palme d'Or winner – (Italy)
Like Two Drops of Water (Als twee druppels water), directed by Fons Rademakers – (Netherlands)
Lilies of the Field, directed by Ralph Nelson, starring Sidney Poitier
The List of Adrian Messenger, directed by John Huston, starring George C. Scott
The Little Soldier (Le petit soldat), directed by Jean-Luc Godard, starring Anna Karina – (France)
Lord of the Flies, directed by Peter Brook – (U.K.)
The Love Eterne (Liang Shan Bo yu Zhu Ying Tai) – (Hong Kong)
Love Is a Ball, starring Glenn Ford, Hope Lange, Charles Boyer, Ricardo Montalbán
Love with the Proper Stranger, starring Natalie Wood and Steve McQueen

M
The Mad Executioners (Der Henker von London), directed by Edwin Zbonek – (West Germany)
 Maigret Sees Red (Maigret voit rouge), starring Jean Gabin – (France/Italy)
The Man from the Diner's Club, directed by Frank Tashlin, starring Danny Kaye
Maniac, directed by Michael Carreras
Mary, Mary, starring Debbie Reynolds, Diane McBain and Barry Nelson
Matango (a.k.a. Attack of the Mushroom People), directed by Ishirō Honda – (Japan)
Mathias Sandorf, directed by Georges Lampin – (Italy/France/Spain)
A Matter of Choice, directed by Vernon Sewell, starring Anthony Steel – (U.K.)
McLintock!, starring John Wayne and Maureen O'Hara
The Mind Benders, starring Dirk Bogarde and Mary Ure – (U.K.)
Miracle of the White Stallions, starring Robert Taylor, Lilli Palmer, Eddie Albert
Monstrosity (a.k.a. The Atomic Brain), directed by Joseph V. Mascelli
Mother of the Bride (Omm el aroussa) – (Egypt)
The Mouse on the Moon, directed by Richard Lester – (U.K.)
Move Over, Darling, starring Doris Day, James Garner, Polly Bergen, Chuck Connors
Mujhe Jeene Do (Let Me Live), starring Sunil Dutt – (India)
Murder at the Gallop (1963), a Miss Marple film directed by George Pollock – (U.K./U.S.)
Muriel (a.k.a. Muriel ou le Temps d'un retour), directed by Alain Resnais, starring Delphine Seyrig – (France)
My Six Loves, starring Debbie Reynolds, Cliff Robertson, David Janssen

N
Naked Among Wolves (Nackt unter Wölfen) – (East Germany)
Nartanasala, starring N. T. Rama Rao and Savitri – (India)
A New Kind of Love, starring Paul Newman and Joanne Woodward
New Tale of Zatoichi (新・座頭市物語, Shin Zatoichi monogatari), third film of the Zatoichi trilogy – (Japan)
Nine Hours to Rama, directed by Mark Robson, starring Horst Buchholz, Diane Baker, José Ferrer – (U.K./U.S.)
Not on Your Life (El Verdugo), directed by Luis García Berlanga, starring Nino Manfredi – (Spain)
Nunca pasa nada (Nothing Ever Happens), directed by Juan Antonio Bardem – (Spain)
Nurse on Wheels, directed by Gerald Thomas – (U.K.)
Nutty, Naughty Chateau (Château en suède), directed by Roger Vadim – (France/Spain)
The Nutty Professor, directed by and starring Jerry Lewis, with Stella Stevens

O
The Old Dark House, directed by William Castle – (U.K./U.S.)
One Man's Way, directed by Denis Sanders and starring Don Murray
Operation Bikini, starring Tab Hunter, Frankie Avalon, Gary Crosby
Ophélia, directed by Claude Chabrol – (France)
Opiate '67 (I mostri), directed by Dino Risi – (Italy)
Optimistic Tragedy (Оптимистическая трагедия), directed by Samson Samsonov – (U.S.S.R.)
The Organizer (I compagni), directed by Mario Monicelli, starring Marcello Mastroianni – (Italy)

P
PT 109, starring Cliff Robertson as John F. Kennedy
Papa's Delicate Condition, starring Jackie Gleason
The Paper Man (El hombre de papel) – (Mexico)
Paranoiac, starring Janette Scott and Oliver Reed – (U.K.)
Passenger (Pasażerka) – (Poland)
The Pink Panther, directed by Blake Edwards, starring David Niven, Peter Sellers, Robert Wagner, Capucine
Pour la suite du monde (For Those Who Will Follow) – (Canada)
The Prize, starring Paul Newman and Elke Sommer
Promises! Promises!, starring Jayne Mansfield
The Punch and Judy Man, starring Tony Hancock – (U.K.)

R
Rampage, starring Robert Mitchum and Elsa Martinelli
The Raven, directed by Roger Corman, starring Vincent Price, Peter Lorre, Boris Karloff
Raven's End (Kvarteret Korpen), directed by Bo Widerberg – (Sweden)
The Red Lanterns (Ta Kokkina fanaria) – (Greece)
The Running Man, directed by Carol Reed, starring Laurence Harvey, Alan Bates, Lee Remick – (U.K.)

S
The Sadist (a.k.a. Profile of Terror or Sweet Baby Charlie), directed by James Landis
Saladin the Victorious, directed by Youssef Chahine - (Egypt)
Sammy Going South (released in the U.S. as A Boy Ten Feet Tall), directed by Alexander Mackendrick – (U.K.)
Savage Sam, a sequel to Old Yeller directed by Norman Tokar
The Scarecrow of Romney Marsh, directed by James Neilson
The Scarlet Blade (released in the U.S. as The Crimson Blade), directed by John Gilling – (U.K.)
Scum of the Earth!, directed by Herschell Gordon Lewis
The Servant, directed by Joseph Losey, starring Dirk Bogarde, Sarah Miles, James Fox – (U.K.)
Shock Corridor, directed by Samuel Fuller, starring Peter Breck and Constance Towers
Showdown, starring Audie Murphy
The Silence (Tystnaden), written and directed by Ingmar Bergman – (Sweden)
 The Small World of Sammy Lee, written and directed by Ken Hughes – (U.K.)
 Soft Hands, directed by Mahmoud Zulfikar – (Egypt)
Sodom and Gomorrah, starring Stewart Granger, Anouk Aimée, Pier Angeli
Soldier in the Rain, starring Steve McQueen and Jackie Gleason
Son of Flubber, starring Fred MacMurray
Sparrows Can't Sing, starring Barbara Windsor and Roy Kinnear – (U.K.)
Spencer's Mountain, starring Henry Fonda and Maureen O'Hara
The Squeaker (Der Zinker), directed by Alfred Vohrer – (West Germany/France)
Station Six-Sahara, directed by Seth Holt – (U.K./West Germany)
The Stripper, starring Joanne Woodward, Richard Beymer, Claire Trevor, Gypsy Rose Lee
Stolen Hours, starring Susan Hayward and Diane Baker
The Success (Il successo), starring Vittorio Gassman and Jean-Louis Trintignant – (Italy)
Summer Holiday, starring Cliff Richard, Lauri Peters and The Shadows – (U.K.)
Summer Magic, starring Dorothy McGuire, Hayley Mills, Deborah Walley
Sunday in New York, starring Jane Fonda, Rod Taylor, Cliff Robertson, Robert Culp
Sunshine in a Net (Slnko v sieti) – (Czechoslovakia)
Suzanne's Career (La carrière de Suzanne), directed by Éric Rohmer – (France)
Sweet and Sour (Dragées au poivre), directed by Jacques Baratier – (Italy/France)
Sweet Skin (Strip-tease), directed by Jacques Poitrenaud – (Italy/France)
The Sword in the Stone, an animated Disney film

T
Taj Mahal – (India)
Take Her, She's Mine, starring James Stewart, Sandra Dee and Audrey Meadows
Take It All (À tout prendre, a.k.a. All Things Considered) directed by Claude Jutra – (Canada)
Tammy and the Doctor, starring Sandra Dee and Peter Fonda
Los Tarantos, directed by Francisco Rovira Beleta – (Spain)
Tarzan's Three Challenges, starring Jock Mahoney – (U.K./U.S.)
The Terror, produced and directed by Roger Corman
That Kind of Girl, directed by Gerry O'Hara – (U.K.)
This Sporting Life, directed by Lindsay Anderson, starring Richard Harris and Rachel Roberts – (U.K.)
The Three Stooges Go Around the World in a Daze, starring the Three Stooges
The Thrill of It All, directed by Norman Jewison, starring Doris Day and James Garner
A Ticklish Affair, directed by George Sidney, starring Shirley Jones and Gig Young
To Die in Madrid (Mourir à Madrid), a documentary film directed by Frédéric Rossif – (France)
Tom Jones, directed by Tony Richardson, starring Albert Finney and Susannah York (U.K.)
Torpedo Bay, starring James Mason and Lilli Palmer – (Italy/France)
Toys in the Attic, directed by George Roy Hill, starring Dean Martin, Geraldine Page and Yvette Mimieux
Twice-Told Tales, starring Vincent Price
Twilight of Honor, starring Richard Chamberlain

U
The Ugly American, starring Marlon Brando
Uncle Vanya, starring Michael Redgrave, Laurence Olivier, Joan Plowright – (U.K.)
Under the Yum Yum Tree, starring Jack Lemmon, Dean Jones, Carol Lynley, Edie Adams

V
Vice and Virtue (Le vice et la vertu), starring Annie Girardot, Robert Hossein and Catherine Deneuve – (France)
The Victors, starring George Peppard, George Hamilton, Vince Edwards, Romy Schneider, Jeanne Moreau – (U.K.)
La visita (The Visitor), starring Sandra Milo – (Italy)
The V.I.P.s, starring Elizabeth Taylor, Richard Burton, Rod Taylor, Maggie Smith, Louis Jourdan, Margaret Rutherford, Orson Welles – (U.K.)
Voyage to the End of the Universe (Ikarie XB-1), directed by Jindřich Polák – (Czechoslovakia)

W
Walking the Streets of Moscow (Ya shagayu po Moskve) – (U.S.S.R.)
Wall of Noise, directed by Richard Wilson and starring Suzanne Pleshette and Ty Hardin
What a Crazy World, directed by Michael Carreras – (U.K.)
What's a Nice Girl Like You Doing in a Place Like This?, a short film directed by Martin Scorsese 
The Wheeler Dealers, starring James Garner and Lee Remick
The Whip and the Body (La frusta e il corpo), directed by Mario Bava under the alias "John M. Old"
Who's Been Sleeping in My Bed?, starring Dean Martin, Carol Burnett, Elizabeth Montgomery, Jill St. John
Who's Minding the Store?, starring Jerry Lewis, Agnes Moorehead, Jill St. John
Winter Light (Nattvardsgästerna), directed by Ingmar Bergman – (Sweden)
Wives and Lovers, starring Janet Leigh, Shelley Winters, Martha Hyer
Women of the World (La donna nel mondo), directed by Gualtiero Jacopetti, Paolo Cavara and Franco Prosperi – (Italy)
The Wrong Arm of the Law, starring Peter Sellers – (U.K.)

X
X: The Man with the X-ray Eyes, directed by Roger Corman, starring Ray Milland

Y
The Yellow Canary, starring Pat Boone
Yesterday, Today and Tomorrow (Ieri, oggi, domani), directed by Vittorio De Sica, starring Sophia Loren and Marcello Mastroianni – Academy Award for Best Foreign Language Film – (Italy)
Yoso, directed by Teinosuke Kinugasa – (Japan)
Young Aphrodites (Mikres Afrodites) – (Greece)
Youth of the Beast (Yajū no seishun), directed by Seijun Suzuki – (Japan)

Z

 Zatoichi on the Road (座頭市喧嘩旅, Zatōichi kenka-tabi), directed by Kimiyoshi Yasuda – (Japan)
 Zatoichi the Fugitive (座頭市兇状旅, Zatōichi Kyōjō tabi), directed by Tokuzō Tanaka – (Japan)

Short film series
Looney Tunes (1930–1969)
Terrytoons (1930–1964)
Merrie Melodies (1931–1969)
Yosemite Sam (1945-1963)
Speedy Gonzales (1953–1968)

Births
January 4 - Dave Foley, Canadian actor and comedian
January 6 - Tony Halme, Finnish politician, author, actor and singer (d. 2010)
January 8 - Geoff Bell (actor), English actor
January 12 - Matt Malloy, American actor and producer
January 14 - Steven Soderbergh, US director
January 20 - Ingeborga Dapkūnaitė, Lithuanian-Russian-British actress
January 22 - Nicola Duffett, English actress
January 26 - Chin Siu-ho, Hong Kong actor
February 3 - Kirk Baily, American actor (d. 2022)
February 12 - John Michael Higgins, American actor
February 13 - Barry Tubb, American actor and director
February 16 - Faran Tahir, Pakistani-American actor
February 17 
Michael Jordan, US basketball player and occasional actor
Larry the Cable Guy, American stand-up comedian, actor, producer, singer and radio personality
February 21 - William Baldwin, actor
February 22 - Peggy Lu, American actress
March 11 - Alex Kingston, English actress
March 12 - Jake Weber, English actor
March 18 - Vanessa L. Williams, actress, singer and beauty queen
March 19
Stuart McQuarrie, Scottish actor
Mary Scheer, American actress, comedian, screenwriter and producer
March 20
Ofer Samra, American artist and actor
David Thewlis, English actor
March 27 - Quentin Tarantino, director
April 2 - Tim Hodge, American voice actor, story artist, writer, animator, comedian and director
April 4 - Graham Norton, Irish actor, comedian, commentator and presenter
April 6 - Shaun Toub, Iranian-American actor
April 8 - Dean Norris, American actor
April 17 - Joel Murray, actor
April 18 
Conan O'Brien, television entertainer and talk show host
Eric McCormack, Canadian-American actor
April 26 - Jet Li, actor
April 27 - Yammie Lam, Hong Kong actress (d. 2018)
May 10 - Rich Moore, American director, screenwriter and voice actor
May 11 - Natasha Richardson, actress (d. 2009)
May 12 - Gavin Hood, South African filmmaker and actor
May 15
Jamie Harris (actor), British actor
Grant Heslov, American actor and filmmaker
May 25 - Mike Myers, Canadian actor
June 1
Brian Goodman, American director, writer and actor
David Rudman, American puppeteer, writer, director and producer
June 6 - Jason Isaacs, English actor
June 9 - Johnny Depp, US actor
June 10 - Jeanne Tripplehorn, US actress
June 12
Tim DeKay, actor & producer
Patrice Martinez, American actress (d. 2018)
June 15 - Helen Hunt, US actress and director
June 17 - Greg Kinnear, American actor, producer and television personality
June 22 - Heidi Kozak, Danish-American actress
June 25
John Benjamin Hickey, American actor
Jackie Swanson, American actress
June 29 - Judith Hoag, American actress
June 30 - Rupert Graves, English actor
July 2 - Mark Kermode, English critic
July 4 - Raman Hui, Hong Kong animator, driector and producer
July 13 - Sandy Fox, American voice actress
July 15 - Brigitte Nielsen, Danish actress, model, singer and reality television personality
July 17 - Stephen Tredre, English actor and writer (d. 1997)
July 27 - Donnie Yen, Hong Kong actor
July 29 - Alexandra Paul, US actress
July 30 - Lisa Kudrow, US actress
August 1
Demián Bichir, Mexican-American actor
John Carroll Lynch, American character actor and director
Coolio, American rapper and actor (d. 2022)
August 2 - Igor Khait, American animator (d. 2016)
August 3 - Lisa Ann Walter, American actress, comedian and producer
August 5 - Mark Strong, English actor
August 7
Ramon Estevez, American actor and director
Harold Perrineau, US actor
August 9 - Whitney Houston, American actress, producer and singer (d. 2012)
August 13 - Sridevi, Indian actress (d. 2018)
August 14 - Emmanuelle Béart, French actress
August 16 - Christine Cavanaugh, American actress (d. 2014)
August 19 - Darcy DeMoss, American actress
August 23 - Ed Gale, American actor and stunt performer
August 24 - Hideo Kojima, Japanese video game designer, director, producer, and writer
August 28 - Peter Mygind, Danish actor
August 30 - Michael Chiklis, American actor, director and producer
September 3
Serena Gordon, English actress
Holt McCallany, American actor, producer and writer
September 5 - Jonny Phillips (actor), English actor
September 8
David Lee Smith, American actor
Larry Zerner, American actor
September 12 - Michael McElhatton, Irish actor and writer
September 17 - Gian-Carlo Coppola, American producer and actor (d. 1986)
September 18 - Christopher Heyerdahl, Canadian actor
September 19 - Dan Povenmire, animator and voice actor
September 20 - Ivan Heng, Singaporean actor
September 21 - Angus Macfadyen, Scottish actor
September 25 - Tate Donovan, American actor and director
September 27
Marc Maron, American stand-up comedian, podcaster, writer, actor, and musician
Brian Steele, American actor
October 1 - Beth Chamberlin, American actress
October 6 - Elisabeth Shue, US actress
October 8 - David Yates, English director, producer and writer
October 12 - Dave Legeno, English actor (d. 2014)
October 14 - Lori Petty, American actress
October 23 - Allison Shearmur, American producer (d. 2018)
October 27 - Deborah Moore, English actress
October 29 - Jed Brophy, New Zealand actor
October 30 - Michael Beach, American actor
October 31
Sanjeev Bhaskar, British actor, comedian and television presenter
Dermot Mulroney, American actor
Rob Schneider, actor and comedian
November 3 - Brian Henson, American puppeteer, director and director
November 5 - Tatum O'Neal, American actress
November 10 - Hugh Bonneville, English actor
November 12 - Sam Lloyd, American actor and singer (d. 2020)
November 20 - Ming-Na Wen, American actress
November 22 - Ingvar Eggert Sigurðsson, Icelandic actor
November 25 - Kevin Chamberlin, American actor and singer
November 27 
Vladimir Mashkov, Russian actor
Fisher Stevens, US actor
December 5 - Carrie Hamilton, American actress and singer (d. 2002)
December 6 - Jens Hultén, Swedish actor
December 8 - Wendell Pierce, American actor
December 15 - Helen Slater, US actress
December 16
Benjamin Bratt, American actor, producer and activist
James Mangold, American filmmaker
December 18 - Brad Pitt, actor
December 19 
Jennifer Beals, actress
Til Schweiger, actor
December 23 - Jess Harnell, American voice actor and singer

Deaths
January 1 – Filippo Del Giudice, 70, Italian film producer
January 2 
Dick Powell, 58, American actor, director, Murder, My Sweet, The Bad and the Beautiful
Jack Carson, 52, Canadian actor, Cat on a Hot Tin Roof, Mildred Pierce
January 6 – Frank Tuttle, 70, American director, This Gun for Hire, Waikiki Wedding
January 26 – Ole Olsen, 70, American actor and comedian, Hellzapoppin'
January 28 – John Farrow, 58, Australian director, Hondo, The Big Clock
February 2 – William Gaxton, 69, American actor and singer, Diamond Horseshoe, The Heat's On
February 8 – George Dolenz, 55, Hungarian actor, Vendetta, My Cousin Rachel
February 18 – Monte Blue, 76, American actor, Key Largo, White Shadows in the South Seas
March 18 – Wanda Hawley, 67, American actress, The Young Rajah, The Midnight Message
March 25 – Felix Adler, 79, American screenwriter, Saps at Sea, Block-Heads
April 4 – Jason Robards Sr., 70, American actor, Mr. Blandings Builds His Dream House, Isle of the Dead
April 30 – Bryant Washburn, 74, American actor, Sky Patrol, Adventures of Captain Marvel
May 2 – Oscar A. C. Lund,  77, Swedish film actor, director, and writer
May 6 – Monty Woolley, 74, American actor, The Bishop's Wife, The Man Who Came to Dinner
May 17 – Daniel Mendaille, 77, French actor, On Trial, Napoléon 
May 19 – Luana Walters, 50, American actress, Mexicali Rose, The Corpse Vanishes
July 1 - Ezz El-Dine Zulficar, Egyptian director and producer The Second Man, The River of Love
June 7 – ZaSu Pitts, 69, American actress, Greed, Life with Father
June 18 – Pedro Armendáriz, 51, Mexican actor, The Fugitive, Fort Apache
June 20 – Gordon Jones, 51, American actor, I Take This Oath, The Green Hornet
July 10 – John Sutton, 54, Pakistani actor, The Three Musketeers, Captain from Castile
July 25 – Leota Lane, 59, American singer, actress, Three Hollywood Girls
August 4 – Tom Keene, 66, American actor, Our Daily Bread, Ghost Valley
August 14 – Clifford Odets, 57, American playwright and screenwriter, Sweet Smell of Success, None but the Lonely Heart
August 17 – Richard Barthelmess, 68, American actor, Broken Blossoms, Only Angels Have Wings
August 23 – Mary Gordon, 81, Scottish actress, Smart Guy, Shamrock Hill
August 25 – Edward L. Cahn, 64, American director, It! The Terror from Beyond Space, Girls in Prison
October 8 – 
 Frank R. Adams, 80, American composer and screenwriter, Peg o' My Heart, The Cowboy and the Lady
 Grace Darmond, 68, Canadian actress, What Every Woman Wants, The Hope Diamond Mystery
October 11 – Jean Cocteau, 74, French director and screenwriter, Beauty and the Beast, Orpheus
October 18 – Constance Worth, 52, Australian actress, China Passage, Meet Boston Blackie
October 29 – Adolphe Menjou, 73, American actor, Paths of Glory, A Star is Born
October 31
 Henry Daniell, 69, British actor, Sherlock Holmes and the Voice of Terror, The Great Dictator
 Hans Jacoby, 59, German screenwriter, Reunion in Reno, Champagne for Caesar
November 1 – Elsa Maxwell, 82, American gossip columnist, Rhapsody in Blue, Stage Door Canteen
November 15 - Paul Sloane, 70, American director, The Woman Accused, Down to Their Last Yacht
November 25 
 Jean Brooks, 47, American actress, The Leopard Man, The Seventh Victim
 Joseph Sweeney, 79, American actor, 12 Angry Men, The Man in the Grey Flannel Suit
November 29 – Charles Schnee, 47, American screenwriter, The Bad and the Beautiful, Red River
November 30
Phil Baker, 67, American comedian and actor, The Gang's All Here, Take It or Leave It
Gina Malo, 54, American actress, The Gang Show, All In
December 2
Sabu, 39, Indian actor, Jungle Book, The Thief of Bagdad
 Mario Zampi, 60, Italian director, The Naked Truth, Five Golden Hours
December 4 – Robert Hamer, 52, British director, Kind Hearts and Coronets, Dead of Night
December 5 – Tom London, 74, American actor, Calamity Jane, High Noon
December 12 
Yasujirō Ozu, 60, Japanese director and screenwriter, Tokyo Story, Late Spring
Barbara Read, 45, Canadian actress, Three Smart Girls, The Shadow Returns

Film debuts
Alan Alda – Gone are the Days!
James Brolin – Take Her, She's Mine
Mel Brooks – The Critic
James Caan – Irma la Douce
William Daniels – Ladybug Ladybug
Dick Van Dyke – Bye Bye Birdie
Héctor Elizondo – The Fat Black Pussycat
Antonio Fargas – The Cool World
Louise Fletcher – A Gathering of Eagles
Peter Fonda – Tammy and the Doctor
Teri Garr – Fun in Acapulco
Clint Howard – The Courtship of Eddie's Father
Jeroen Krabbé – Fietsen naar de Maan
Christopher Lambert – Who's Minding the Store?
Geoffrey Lewis – The Fat Black Pussycat
Estelle Parsons – Ladybug Ladybug
Kurt Russell – It Happened at the World's Fair
Lynn Redgrave – Tom Jones
Donald Sutherland – The World Ten Times Over
Andrei Tarkovsky – Ivan's Childhood a.k.a. Ivanovo Detstvo

References 

 
Film by year